The Women's Road Race event at the 2010 South American Games was held at 9:00 on March 22.

Medalists

Results
Race distance: 73.2 km

References
Report

Road Race W
2010 in women's road cycling